Rory Beggan is a Gaelic footballer from Scotstown, County Monaghan, Republic of Ireland, who plays at senior level for the Monaghan county team. In November 2018, Beggan won an All-Star award.

History 
Beggan plays his club Gaelic football for Scotstown GAA. Beggan was first called up to play inter-county football for Monaghan in 2011 by Eamon McEneaney. Whilst playing county football, he gained a reputation as a goalkeeper with a long kick and was able to score points from inside his own half. Later he was designated as Monaghan's free kick taker. Keen to practice his free kicks, in 2018 he disguised himself as a member of the backroom team in order to get more practice time with Queen's University Belfast's minors team in Northern Ireland. 

Between 2011 and 2018, he had scored 0-43 points, the joint highest for a goalkeeper. Beggan's style of play has been viewed as an evolution of the goalkeeper position being more involved in attacking and scoring moves as ten years prior to 2019, there had been no points scored by any goalkeeper in All-Ireland competition. In 2018, he was named as an All-Ireland All-Star, despite missing a last minute scoring attempt against Tyrone in the 2018 All-Ireland Senior Football Championship semi-finals. He was invited to travel to Philadelphia with the rest of the All-Stars but declined in favour of playing for Scotstown in their Ulster Senior Club Football Championship semi-final.

Honours
 All Star (1): 2018

 Ulster Senior Football Championship: 2013,2015

 Ulster Senior Club Football Championship:
Runner-up: 2015, 2018
 Monaghan Senior Football Championship:
 2013, 2015, 2016, 2017, 2018, 2020, 2021

References

Living people
Gaelic football goalkeepers
Monaghan inter-county Gaelic footballers
Year of birth missing (living people)